"Dusic" is a song by Brick, issued as the lead single from the band's eponymous second album. The song was the band's final hit single on the Billboard Hot 100, peaking at No. 18 in 1977. 

MC Hammer sampled the song for his hit "It's All Good" from The Funky Headhunter.

Chart positions

References

1976 songs
1977 singles
Brick (band) songs
Bang Records singles